How To with John Wilson is an American television comedy docuseries created by filmmaker John Wilson. The series, executive produced by Nathan Fielder, Michael Koman and Clark Reinking, was ordered by HBO. It premiered on October 23, 2020. On December 9, 2020, HBO renewed the series for a second season, which premiered on November 26, 2021. In February 2022, the series was renewed for a third season.

Premise
John Wilson attempts to give advice while dealing with his own personal issues. The 25-minute episodes, framed as tutorials and filmed mainly on the streets of New York City, cover topics from small talk to scaffolding. While each episode initially focuses on its title topic, in the course of his investigation, Wilson meets people and strikes up conversations that lead in unpredictable and diverse directions. For example, the episode "How to Improve Your Memory" ends up featuring a conference on the Mandela effect in Ketchum, Idaho.

Production
John Wilson explained to Variety about his process of making the show:

Episodes

Season 1 (2020)

Season 2 (2021)

Reception

Critical response
How To with John Wilson has received critical acclaim. On Rotten Tomatoes, the first season has a score of 100% with an average rating of 8.5/10 based on 21 reviews. The site's critical consensus reads: "Surprising, thoughtful, and superbly strange, How To with John Wilsons blend of documentary styles comes together to create a singularly delightful experience." On Metacritic, the first season has a weighted average score of 84 out of 100, based on 7 reviews, indicating "universal acclaim".

Daniel Fienberg of The Hollywood Reporter wrote How To with John Wilson is "funny, sad, and, in the end, shockingly profound." Steve Greene of IndieWire gave the series a positive review of an A−, saying it has "a hint of darkness and a wealth of empathy."

The second season received critical acclaim. On Metacritic, the season has a weighted average score of 92 out of 100, based on 4 reviews, indicating "universal acclaim".

Accolades

References

External links
 
 
 

English-language television shows
2020s American documentary television series
2020 American television series debuts
HBO original programming
Television shows filmed in New York City